Hermann Ulrich Kantorowicz (18 November 1877, Posen, German Empire – 12 February 1940, Cambridge) was a German jurist.

He was a professor at Freiburg University (1923-1929), and a Visiting Professor, Columbia University (1927), as well as at Kiel University (1929-1933). He was dismissed from Kiel on political and antisemitic grounds in 1933, and became lecturer at the 'University in Exile' and at City College, New York, 1933–34. Then he was lecturer at the London School of Economics, All Souls College Oxford and Cambridge University, 1934–37, and Assistant Director of Research in Law, Cambridge, 1937-1940.

Report on German war guilt issue 

Kantorowicz caused heated debate when details of his report for the parliamentary investigative committee on the question of Germany's guilt in triggering World War I became known. Contrary to the prevailing opinion in Germany, he concluded in 1923 that Germany's responsibility in the outbreak of the war was of great importance. Kantorowicz cited the official German White Book of 3 August 1914, as an example. About 75 percent of the documents that it presented had falsified to deny Germany's involvement in the outbreak of the First World War. 

When Kantorowicz was proposed for election as a full professor at the University of Kiel shortly thereafter in 1927, Foreign Minister Gustav Stresemann (DVP) raised his objections to this in a letter to the Minister of Culture Carl Heinrich Becker (SPD). Stresemann saw Germany as innocent of the origins of the First World War and, after the advice from the former diplomat and politician Johannes Kriege (DVP), wanted to prevent Kantorowicz's critical view of Germany's actions, which went as far as "masochism", from being reinforced by the award of a full professorship in Kiel.

Selected works

A comprehensive bibliography can be found in Relativismus und Freirecht,ein Versuch űber Hermann Kantorowicz by Karlheinz Muscheler , C.F. Müller Juristicher Verlag, Heidelberg, 1984

 Aesthetik der Lyrik. Das Georgesche Gedicht (w. Heinrich Goesch), 1902, under pseudonym of Kuno Zwymann.
 Goblers Karolinen-Kommentar und seine Nachfolger, 1904
 Der Kampf um die Rechtswissenschaft, (under pseudonym of Gnaeus Flavius)1906# 
 Una festa bolognese per l'Epifania del 1289, 1906
 Schriftvergleichung und Urkundenfälschung, 1906
 Cino da Pistoja ed il primo trattato di medicina legale, 1906##
 Probleme der Strafrechtsvergleichung, 1907
 Albertus Gandinus und das Strafrecht der Scholastik, Erster Band: Die Praxis, 1907
 Die Freiheit des Richters bei der Strafzumessung, 1908
 Zur Lehre vom richtigen Recht, 1909
 Über die Entstehung der Digestenvulgata, 1910
 Die contra-legem-Fabel, 1910
 Der Strafgesetzentwurf und die Wissenschaft, 1910/11
 Rechtswissenschaft und Soziologie, 1911#
 Was ist uns Savigny?,1912##
 Volksgeist und historische Rechtsschule, 1912##
 Wider die Todesstrafe, 1912
 Max Conrat(Cohn)und die mediävistische Forschung, 1912
 Ausgabe von Max Conrats Schrift, Römisches Recht im frühesten Mittelalter, 1913
 Zu den Quellen des Schwabenspiegels, 1913##
 Die Epochen Der Rechtswissenschaft, 1914##
 Der Offiziershass im deutschen Heer, 1919
 Thomas Diplovatatius. De claris juris consultis. Bd. 1. (w. Fritz Schulz), 1919.
 Der Umsturz in Pesaro 1516, 1919
 Deutschlands Interesse am Völkerbund, 1920
 Staatsbürgerkunde als Unterrichtsfach, 1920
 Die Zukunft des strafrechtlichen Unterrichts, 1920
 Einführung in die Textkritik, 1921##
 Bismarcks Schatten* ,1921
 Hinter den Kulissen von Versailles, 1921
 Geschichte des Gandinustextes, 1. Teil, 1921
 Verteidigung des Völkersbundes. 1922
 Der italienische Strafgsetzentwurf und seine Lehre, 1922
 Notiz über Max Weber in Logos XI, 1922#
 Das Principium Decretalium des Johannes de Deo, 1922
 Geschichte des Gandinustextes, 2. Teil, 1922
 Der Völkerbund im Jahre 1922
 Der Aufbau der Soziologie, in Erinnerungsgabe für Max Weber, 1923#
 Die Idee des Völkerbundes, 1923
 Should Germany join the League of Nations? In Foreign Affairs, 1924
 Germany and the League of Nations, lecture to Fabian Society, 1924
 Leben und Schriften des Albertus Gandinus, 1924
 Studien zum altitalienischen Strafprozeß. I. Bologneser Strafprozeßordnung von 1288; II. Der Tractatus de tormentis, 1924##
 Fechenbachurteil und Kriegsschuldfrage, 1925
 Studien zur Kriegsschuldfrage, 1925
 Pazifismus und Fascismus, 1925
 Savigny-Briefe, 1925
 Staatsauffassungen. Eine Skizze, 1925#
 Il 'Tractatus criminum', per il cinquantenario della Rivista Penale, Citta di Castello, 1925##
 Aus der Vorgeschichte der Freirechtslehre, 1925#
 Albertus Gndinus und der Strafrecht der Scholastik, 2. Band, 1926
 Die Irrationalität der englischen Politik, 1926
 Der Landesverrat im deutschen Strafrecht, 1926/27
 The New Germanic Constitution in Theory and Practice, 1927
 Damasus, 1927
 Naber zum Brachylogus, 1927
 Ein vergessener Tatbestand: die Kriegshetze, 1927/28
 Die Wahrheit über Sarajevo, 1928
 Legal Science. A summary of its methodology, 1928#
 Verfolgungseifer, 1928/29
 Die Sterilisierung von Minderwertigen in den Vereinigten Staaten, 1929
 Grundbegriffe der Literaturgeschichte, 1929##
Kritische Studien zur Quellen- und Literatur- geschichte des röm. Rechts im Mittelalter, 1929
 Accursio e la sua biblioteca, 1929
 Nochmals Sarajevo, 1929
 Der Geist der englischen Politik u. d. Gespenst der Einkreisung Deutschlands, 1929
 Eine Gesamtausgabe des Pillius in Vorbereitung, 1930
 English Politics through German eyes, 1930
 Praestantia Doctorum, Festschrift für Max Poppenheim, 1931##
 The Spirit of British Policy and the Myth of the Encirclement of Germany, 1931
 Trauerrede auf Julius Landmann, 1932
 The Concept of the State, 1932
 Die Allegationen im späten Mittelalter, 1932##
 Savignys Marburger Methodenlehre, 1933##
 De ornatu Mulierum, 1933##
 Tat und Schuld, 1933
 Current misunderstandings of Hitlerism, under pseudonym of Cassander, 1933
 Some Rationalism about Realism, 1934#
 Baldus de Ubaldis and the subjective theory of guilt, 1934##
 Rapport sur les Sources du Droit, 1934
 Dictatorships, with a bibliography by Alexander Elkin, 1935
 
 Savigny and the Historical School of Law, 1937##
 Les origines françaises des Exceptiones Petri, 1937##
 De Pugna. La letteratura longobardistica sul duello giudiziario, 1938## 
 Has Capitalism failed in Law?, 1835-1935, 1938
 De Pugna. La Letteratura Longobardistica sul Duello Giudiziario, 1938##
 Les origines françaises des Exceptiones Petri, 1938##
 The poetical sermon of a medieval jurist, 1938##
 Studies in the Glossators of the Roman Law: w. W.W.Buckland, 1938
 The Quaestiones disputatae of the Glossators, 1939##

(Posthumous publications)
 Bractonian Problems, 1941
 An English Theologian's view of Roman Law, w. Beryl Smalley, edited by Nicolai Rubinstein, 1941##
 A Greek Justinian Constitution, quoted in the Dissensiones Dominorum, 1945##
 The Definition of Law, with introduction by Arthur Goodhart, 1958. Also translated into Italian, La Definizione del Diritto, trans. Enrico di Robilant, 1962; into German, Der Begriff des Rechts, trans. Werner Goldschmidt and Gerd Kastendieck, 1963; into Spanish, La Definícón del Derecho, trans. J.M. de la Vego, 1964
 Gutachten zur Kriegsschuldfrage 1914, edited with an introduction by Imanuel Geiss, 1967
 Diplovatatius 2. Band, edited by Giuseppe Rabotti, 1968

Collected small writings
At the instigation of his widow, Mrs Hilda Kantorowicz (1892-1974), the more significant small writings of Hermann Kantorowicz were published in the two following works. These writings are marked with '#' or '##' respectively in the above bibliography

 Rechtswissenschaft und Soziologie: ausgewählte Schriften zur Wissenschaftslehre, edited by Thomas Würtenberger, Verlag C.F. Müller, Karlsruhe, 1962
 Rechtshistorische Schriften, selected and edited by Helmut Coing and Gerhard Immel, Verlag C.F. Müller, Karlsruhe, 1970

References

External links
 Autobiographical Website
 Detailed analysis of Kantorowicz's Life

German jurists
Lawyers from Poznan
Columbia University faculty
1877 births
1940 deaths
Jewish emigrants from Nazi Germany to the United Kingdom